Gillian Catherine Leng, Lady Cosford CBE is a British health administrator, academic, visiting professor at King's College London and the former Chief Executive of the National Institute for Health and Care Excellence (NICE), where she was responsible for several programmes and guidelines including the guidelines on COVID-19.

She has been involved in the Cochrane collaboration since its foundation, and has worked on clinical trials and epidemiological research in public health medicine. She also teaches at the NUS Saw Swee Hock School of Public Health.

Education
Gillian Leng gained her medical degree from the University of Leeds in 1987, having previously gained a degree in physiology. She completed her house jobs at St James's University Hospital and subsequently moved to Scotland to work as a senior house officer in cancer care and in accident and emergency. She received her MD in 1994.

Career
Leng has been involved in the Cochrane collaboration since its foundation. She worked on clinical trials and epidemiological research in Edinburgh, and in London as a consultant in public health medicine.

Leng participated as a keynote speaker at the 2015 International Festival of Public Health. She was also speaker at the World Neuroscience Innovation Forum in 2017, where she discussed gene therapy and cell therapy in treating neurological diseases. She then spoke at the ISPOR Summit 2018.

Leng delivered a presentation for the European Society of Cardiology at an event titled Digital Health 2019.

She became Deputy Chief Executive at the National Institute for Health and Care Excellence (NICE) in 2007. In April 2020, during the first COVID-19 lockdown, she succeeded Andrew Dillon as the CEO of NICE. There, she oversaw the creation of new guidelines on COVID-19. Previously she was responsible for the initial set up and running of NICE's clinical guidelines programme, for establishing the NICE implementation function, and for setting up NHS Evidence. Her other roles included being responsible for the NICE accreditation programme, guideline development in social care, and the NICE programmes of indicators and quality standards.

She is visiting professor at King's College London, and teaches at NUS Saw Swee Hock School of Public Health. She is a trustee and former chair of the Guidelines International Network. She is also a member of the steering committee of the International Guideline Development Credentialing & Certification Program (INGUIDE).

Leng is a member of the Global Commission on Evidence to Address Societal Challenges. The commission is a partnership spawned out of COVID-END, with leadership from McMaster University and the Ottawa Hospital Research Institute.

In May 2022, Leng was appointed to the advisory board of consulting firm Brevia Health. The Royal Society of Medicine (RSM) appointed her their dean of education in October 2022.

Awards and honours
Leng was awarded a CBE in the 2011 Birthday Honours. She was appointed honorary librarian at the RSM, London, in 2017.

Personal and family
She married Paul Cosford in 2006. Following his death in 2021, she announced her retirement from NICE; Dr Samantha Roberts succeeded her on 1 February 2022.

Selected publications

Articles

Books

References

Further reading

Living people
Academics of King's College London
Alumni of the University of Leeds
Commanders of the Order of the British Empire
Year of birth missing (living people)
British women scientists
British women medical doctors
British women writers
British public health doctors
Wives of knights
Women public health doctors